Starter motor or motor starter may refer to:

Motor controller, a device that regulates the performance of an electric motor
Starter motor, an electric motor that rotates an internal combustion engine until it can power itself, such as in automobiles